Bojana Drča (née Živković) (born March 29, 1988) is a Serbian professional volleyball player. She plays for the Serbia women's national volleyball team and Leningradka Saint Petersburg. She was part of the Serbian team that competed at the 2012 Summer Olympics and won the silver at the 2016 Olympics. She has won gold with the national team at the 2018 World Championship, the 2022 World Championship and the 2017 European Championship.

Awards

National team

Senior Team
 2013 World Grand Prix -  Bronze Medal
 2015 World Cup -  Silver Medal
 2015 European Championship -  Bronze Medal
 2016 Olympic Games -  Silver Medal
 2017 World Grand Prix -  Bronze Medal
 2017 European Championship -  Gold Medal
 2018 World Championship -  Gold Medal
 2022 FIVB Nations League -  Bronze Medal
 2022 World Championship -  Gold Medal

Clubs
2017 Club World Championship -   Bronze medal, with Voléro Zürich

Individual
 2007–08 CEV Cup Final Four "Best Blocker"
 2009–10 CEV Cup Final Four "Best Setter"
  2017 Yeltsin Cup "Best Setter"
 2022 World Championship "Best Setter"

References

External links
 

1988 births
Living people
Sportspeople from Belgrade
Serbian women's volleyball players
Olympic volleyball players of Serbia
Volleyball players at the 2012 Summer Olympics
Volleyball players at the 2015 European Games
European champions for Serbia
European Games medalists in volleyball
European Games bronze medalists for Serbia
Volleyball players at the 2016 Summer Olympics
Olympic medalists in volleyball
Olympic silver medalists for Serbia
Medalists at the 2016 Summer Olympics
Expatriate volleyball players in Russia
Expatriate volleyball players in Switzerland
Expatriate volleyball players in Turkey
Serbian expatriate sportspeople in Russia
Serbian expatriate sportspeople in Switzerland
Serbian expatriate sportspeople in Turkey
Serbian expatriate sportspeople in France
İller Bankası volleyballers
21st-century Serbian women